Philipp Riese (born 12 November 1989) is a German professional football coach and a former central midfielder. He is an assistant coach with Erzgebirge Aue.

Career
Riese announced his retirement as a player in the summer 2022, and in November 2022 he decided to come back to playing with Erzgebirge Aue. On 4 February 2023, Riese retired from playing once again.

References

External links
 

1989 births
Living people
German footballers
Association football midfielders
1. FC Lokomotive Leipzig players
ZFC Meuselwitz players
Arminia Bielefeld players
1. FC Heidenheim players
FC Erzgebirge Aue players
2. Bundesliga players
3. Liga players
Regionalliga players
Oberliga (football) players